The Transnational Boxing Rankings Board (TBRB) is an all-volunteer initiative formed in October 2012 with the intention of providing professional boxing with authoritative top-ten rankings, identifying the singular world champion of every division by unbiased reasoning and common sense, and to insist on the sport's reform. Board members are independent professional journalists, boxing historians and record keepers from around the world.  Their rankings and titles are meant to be uninfluenced by promoters and the traditional sanctioning bodies' paid-for "alphabet belts".

TBRB championships
The TBRB only awards vacant championships when the two top-ranked fighters in any division meet, and currently recognizes legitimate world champions or "true champions" in each weight class. It also presents the "successions" of these championship "thrones."

Three of its recognized champions were identified by The Ring magazine before the TBRB was founded. Thus, the TBRB was formed in order to continue where The Ring "left off" in the aftermath of the latter's purchase by Golden Boy Promotions in 2007, and the following dismissal of the editorial board headed by Nigel Collins. After the new editors announced a controversial new championship policy in May 2012, three prominent members of the Ring Advisory Panel resigned. These three members (Springs Toledo, Cliff Rold and Tim Starks) became the founding members of the TBRB, which was formed over the summer of 2012 with the assistance of Stewart Howe of England.

The group also maintains a pound for pound list which, as of June 2022, is currently topped by Naoya Inoue and official "monthly rankings" for record keepers and boxing historians.

ESPN boxing analyst and commentator Teddy Atlas praised the TBRB's efforts on-air in March 2013 and again during the season finale in August 2013. Several sites have adopted their rankings, including Boxing.com, The Queensberry Rules, The Sweet Science, East Side Boxing, Esquina Boxeo and Stiff Jab.

British magazine Boxing News announced in 2021 that it would only recognize world champions as voted by the TBRB.

TBRB Voting Panel members

There are currently 52 members representing 21 countries on six continents: the United States, England, Italy, the Philippines, Ireland, Chile, Cuba, Costa Rica, Scotland, Canada, New Zealand, Mexico, Puerto Rico, Norway, Sweden, Japan, Thailand, Australia, Argentina, Russia and Ghana.

   Vittorio Parisi  (Chair)
   Cliff Rold  (Chair)
   Tim Starks  (Chair)
   Springs Toledo  (Oversight)
   Stewart Howe  (Tech)
   Adam Abramowitz  (board member)
   Carlos Aguirre  (board member)
   Ramon Aranda  (board member)
   Gonzalo Baeza  (board member)
   Derek Bonnett  (board member)
   Shaun Brown  (board member)
   Brin-Jonathan Butler  (board member)
   Kevin Byrne  (board member)
   Michael Carbert   (board member)
   Lázaro Malvarez Cárdenas  (board member)
   Lou Catalano  (board member)
   Abac Cordero  (board member)
   Jose Corpas  (board member)
   Tom Craze  (board member)
   Jake Donovan  (board member)
   Jeremy Foley  (board member)
   Oliver Fennell  (board member)
   Jeandra LeBeauf  (board member)
   Jorge Lera  (board member)
   Alex McClintock  (board member)
   Matt McGrain  (board member)
   Yuriko Miyata  (board member)
   Diego Morilla  (board member)
   Gabriel Muhr  (board member)
   Gautham Nagesh  (board member)
   James Oddy  (board member)
   Takahiro Onaga  (board member)
   Alister Scott Ottesen  (board member)
   Harry Otty  (board member)
   Per-Ake Persson  (board member)
   Alex Pierpaoli  (board member)
   Ken Pollitt  (Record keeper)
   Jeremiah J. Preisser  (board member)
   Eric Raskin  (board member)
   Victor Salazar  (board member)
   Mauricio Salvador  (Record keeper)
   Michael Shepherd  (board member)
   Don Steinberg  (board member)
   Brandon Stubbs  (board member)
   Alexey Sukachev  (board member)
   Rey Tecson  (Record keeper)
   Luis Torres  (board member)
   Paul Upham  (board member)
   Dave Wilcox  (board member)
   Nick Wong  (board member)
   Steve Zemach  (board member)
   Marquis Johns  (board member)

Successions
The following are the lineal champions recognized by the Transnational Boxing Rankings Board:

Heavyweight
 Oleksandr Usyk W12 Anthony Joshua (20 August 2022–Usyk and Joshua were the top two Transnational-Ranked heavyweights at the time of this bout. Throne declared open as of 15 August 2022 when Fury finally confirmed repeated claims of retirement by vacating a belt.)  
 Tyson Fury TKO7  Deontay Wilder (22 February 2020 — Fury and Wilder were the top two Transnational-Ranked heavyweights at the time of this bout).
 Tyson Fury  W12 Wladimir Klitschko (28 November 2015). (Fury officially abdicates throne 18 October 2016).
 Wladimir Klitschko W12  Alexander Povetkin (5 October 2013 — Klitschhko and Povetkin were the top two Transnational-Ranked heavyweights at the time of this bout).

Cruiserweight
 Jai Opetaia W12 Mairis Briedis (2 July 2022)
 Mairis Briedis W12  Yuniel Dorticós (26 September 2020 — Briedis and Dorticós were the top two Transnational-Ranked cruiserweights at the time of this bout).
 Oleksandr Usyk W12  Murat Gassiev (21 July 2018 — Usyk and Gassiev were the top two Transnational-Ranked cruiserweights at the time of this bout). (Usyk officially abdicates throne 15 October 2019).

Light heavyweight
 Artur Beterbiev TKO10 Oleksandr Gvozdyk (18 October 2019)
 Oleksandr Gvozdyk KO11 Adonis Stevenson (1 December 2018)
 Adonis Stevenson KO1 Chad Dawson (8 June 2013)
 Chad Dawson W12 Bernard Hopkins (28 April 2012)
 Bernard Hopkins W12 Jean Pascal (21 May 2011)
 Jean Pascal TD11 Chad Dawson (14 August 2010 — Pascal and Dawson were the top two RING-rated light heavyweights at the time of this bout).

Super middleweight
 Saul Alvarez W12  Caleb Plant (6 November 2021 — Alvarez and Plant were the top two Transnational-Ranked super middleweights at the time of this bout).
 Andre Ward W12  Carl Froch  (17 December 2011 — Ward  and Froch were the top-two RING-rated super middleweights at the time of this bout). (Ward officially abdicates throne 16 March 2016).

Middleweight
 Saul Alvarez W12  Gennady Golovkin (15 September 2018). (Alvarez officially abdicates throne 1 January 2021).
 Saul Alvarez W12 Miguel Cotto (21 November 2015). (Alvarez officially abdicates throne 18 April 2017).
 Miguel Cotto RTD10 Sergio Martinez (7 June 2014)
 Sergio Martínez W12 Kelly Pavlik (17 April 2010)
 Kelly Pavlik TKO7 Jermain Taylor (29 September 2007)
 Jermain Taylor W12 Bernard Hopkins (16 July 2005)
 Bernard Hopkins TKO12  Félix Trinidad (29 September 2001 — Hopkins and Trinidad were the top two RING-rated middleweights at the time of this bout).

Super welterweight
 Jermell Charlo TKO10  Brian Castaño  (14 May 2022 — Charlo and Castaño were the top two Transnational-Ranked jr. middleweights at the time of this bout).
 Floyd Mayweather Jr. W12  Saul Alvarez (14 September 2013 — Alvarez and Mayweather  were the top two Transnational-Ranked jr. middleweights at the time of this bout). (Mayweather officially abdicates throne 21 September 2015).

Welterweight
 Manny Pacquiao W12  Timothy Bradley (12 April 2016 — Pacquiao and Bradley  were the top two Transnational-Ranked welterweights at the time of this bout). (Pacquiao officially abdicates throne 19 April 2016).
 Floyd Mayweather Jr. W12 Manny Pacquiao (2 May 2015 — Mayweather  and Pacquiao were the top two Transnational-Ranked welterweights at the time of this bout). (Mayweather officially abdicates throne 21 September 2015).

Super lightweight
 Josh Taylor W12  José Ramírez (22 May 2021 — Taylor and Ramírez were the top two Transnational-Ranked jr. welterweights at the time of this bout).
 Mikey Garcia W12  Sergey Lipinets (10 March 2018 — Garcia and Lipinets were the top two Transnational-Ranked jr. welterweights at the time of this bout). (Garcia officially abdicates throne 3 March 2020).
 Terence Crawford W12  Viktor Postol (23 July 2016 — Postol and Crawford were the top two Transnational-Ranked jr. welterweights at the time of this bout). (Crawford officially abdicates throne 6 March 2018).
 Danny Garcia  W12  Lucas Matthysse  (14 September 2013 — Matthysse and Garcia were the top two Transnational-Ranked jr. welterweights at the time of this bout). (Garcia officially abdicates throne August 2015).

Lightweight
 Devin Haney W12 George Kambosos Jr. (4 June 2022)
 George Kambosos Jr. W12 Teófimo López (27 November 2021)
 Teófimo López W12  Vasyl Lomachenko  (17 October 2020 — López and Lomachenko were the top two Transnational-Ranked lightweights at the time of this bout).
 Terence Crawford  W12  Raymundo Beltran (29 November 2014 — Crawford and Beltran were the top two Transnational-Ranked lightweights at the time of this bout). (Crawford officially abdicates throne 18 April 2015).

Super featherweight
 Shakur Stevenson W12  Óscar Valdez (30 April 2022 — Stevenson and Valdez were the top two Transnational-Ranked jr. lightweights at the time of this bout). (Stevenson officially stripped of the throne 23 September 2022 after missing weight).

Super bantamweight
 Guillermo Rigondeaux W12 Nonito Donaire (13 April 2013) (Rigondeaux officially abdicates throne 11 June 2022 by TBRB).
 Nonito Donaire TKO9  Toshiaki Nishioka (13 October 2012 — Nishioka and Donaire were the top two Transnational-Ranked jr. featherweights at the time of this bout).

Bantamweight
 Naoya Inoue TKO2  Nonito Donaire (7 June 2022 — Inoue and Donaire were the top two Transnational-Ranked bantamweights at the time of this bout). (Inoue officially abdicates throne 13 January 2023).

Super flyweight
 Juan Francisco Estrada W12 Srisaket Sor Rungvisai (26 April 2019)
 Srisaket Sor Rungvisai W12 Juan Francisco Estrada (24 February 2018 – Sor Rungvisai and Estrada were the top two Transnational-Ranked jr. bantamweights at the time of this bout).

Flyweight
 Román González TKO9 Akira Yaegashi (5 September 2014). (Gonzalez officially abdicates throne 4 October 2016).
 Akira Yaegashi W12 Toshiyuki Igarashi (8 April 2013)
 Toshiyuki Igarashi W12 Sonny Boy Jaro (16 July 2012)
 Sonny Boy Jaro TKO6 Pongsaklek Wonjongkam (2 March 2012)
 Pongsaklek Wonjongkam W12 Koki Kameda (27 March 2010)
 Kōki Kameda W12 Daisuke Naito (29 November 2009)
 Daisuke Naitō W12 Pongsaklek Wonjongkam (18 July 2007)
 Pongsaklek Wonjongkam TKO1 Malcolm Tunacao (2 March 2001)
 Malcolm Tuñacao TKO7 Medgoen Singsurat (19 May 2000)
 Medgoen Singsurat TKO 3 Manny Pacquiao (17 September 1999)
 Manny Pacquiao KO8 Chatchai Sasakul (4 December 1998)
 Chatchai Sasakul W12 Yuri Arbachakov (12 November 1997)
  Yuri Arbachakov KO8 Muangchai Kittikasem (23 June 1992)
 Muangchai Kittikasem TKO6 Sot Chitalada (15 February 1991)
 Sot Chitalada W12 Yong-Kang Kim (3 June 1989)
 Yong-Kang Kim W12 Sot Chitalada (24 July 1988)
 Sot Chitalada W12 Gabriel Bernal (8 October 1984)
 Gabriel Bernal KO2 Koji Kabayashi (9 April 1984)
 Kōji Kobayashi TKO2 Frank Cedeno (18 January 1984)
 Frank Cedeno TKO6 Charlie Magri (27 September 1983)
 Charlie Magri TKO7 Eleoncio Mercedes (15 March 1983)
 Eleoncio Mercedes W15 Freddie Castillo (6 November 1982)
 Freddie Castillo W15 Prudencio Cardona (24 July 1982)
 Prudencio Cardona KO1 Antonio Avelar (20 March 1982)
 Antonio Avelar KO7 Shoji Oguma (12 May 1981)
 Shoji Oguma KO9 Chan-Hee Park (18 May 1980)
 Chan-Hee Park W15 Miguel Canto (18 March 1979)
 Miguel Canto W15 Shoji Oguma (8 January 1975 — Canto and Oguma were the top two RING-rated flyweights at the time of this bout).

Current champions

Pound-for-pound

See also
 Lineal championship

References

External links

Professional boxing organizations
Sports organizations established in 2012